Thanon Nakhon Chai Si is a khwaeng (sub-district) of Dusit District, in Bangkok, Thailand.

Description
The name "Thanon Nakhon Chai Si" comes from a road in same name that passes through the southern part of the area. The area that this road passes through is a residential community and a market. It is better known as "Rachawat" after its original name.

Yothinburana School used to be situated at Kiak Kai (termination of Samsen road) and moved out in 2008 because of construction of new parliament house (Sappaya-Sapasathan).

Besides, Thanon Nakhon Chai Si is also home to several military units under the Royal Thai Army, such as 1st Cavalry Regiment, King's Guard; 1st Field Artillery Battalion, King's Guard; 4th Cavalry Division King's Guard; and Military Armoured Vehicle Radio Station etc.

Geography
Thanon Nakhon Chai Si has a total area of 5.282 km2 (2.039 mi2), considered as the northernmost and the largest area of the district.

Neighbouring sub-districts are (from the north clockwise): Bang Sue of Bang Sue District (Khlong Bang Sue is a divider line), Phaya Thai of Phaya Thai District (Northern railway line is a divider line), Suan Chitlada, Dusit, and Wachiraphayaban in its district (Khlong Samsen is a divider line), Bang Phlat and Bang O of Bang Phlat District (midstream of Chao Phraya is a divider line).

Demography
In 2017 it had a population of 55,094 people.

Places
(except military bases)

Important places
Sappaya-Sapasathan
Boon Rawd Brewery
Rajinibon School
Royal Irrigation Department
Metropolitan Electricity Authority, Samsen Zonal
Bang Krabue Post Office
Dusit Post Office
Excise Department

Temples
Wat Chan Samoson
Wat Pracha Rabue Tham
Wat Kaeo Fa Chula Mani
Wat Amphawan
Wat Chom Sudaram
Wat Mai Thong Sen

Shopping malls
Ratchawat Market
Si Yan Market
Makro Samsen
Supreme Complex

Transportation
Nakhon Chai Si, Samsen, Rama V, Thahan, Thoet Damri and Pradiphat roads are the main thoroughfare of the area.

Thanon Nakhon Chai Si is served by Chao Phraya Express Boat's four piers: Payap (N18), Irrigation Dept.(N19), Kheaw Khai Ka (N20), Kiak Kai (N21). 

Sam Sen railway station of the State Railway of Thailand site on the border of the district with Phaya Thai.

References

Subdistricts of Bangkok
Dusit district